The 1969–70 South Africa rugby union tour of Britain and Ireland was a rugby union tour by the South Africa national rugby union team to the Northern Hemisphere.

There were a number of anti-apartheid protests throughout the tour.

The controversial tour happened during the apartheid era in South Africa, and came shortly after the D'Oliveira affair. There were protests at many of the matches, by anti-apartheid campaigners, calling themselves 'Stop the Seventy Tour', organised by Peter Hain. Future British prime minister Gordon Brown was the group's Edinburgh organiser.

Matches 

Scores and results list South Africa's points tally first.

References

External links
 International results at ESPN
 Sports campaigns carried out by the Anti Apartheid Movement

Further reading
Geoff Brown and Christian Hogsbjerg, Apartheid is Not a Game: Remembering the Stop The Seventy Tour campaign (Redwords, 2020)
Peter Hain, Don't Play with Apartheid: The Background to the Stop the Seventy Tour Campaign (1971)

1969 rugby union tours
1970 rugby union tours
1969
1969
1969
1969
1969
1969–70 in European rugby union
1969–70 in English rugby union
1969–70 in Welsh rugby union
1969–70 in Scottish rugby union
1969–70 in Irish rugby union
1969 in South African rugby union
1970 in South African rugby union
Rugby union and apartheid
Sports scandals in England
Sports scandals in Scotland
Sports scandals in Ireland
Sports scandals in Wales